Bjugn Church is a parish church of the Church of Norway in Ørland municipality in Trøndelag county, Norway. It is the main church for the Bjugn parish which is part of the Fosen prosti (deanery) in the Diocese of Nidaros. The red, wooden church was built in a cruciform style in 1956 using plans drawn up by the architect John Egil Tverdahl. The church seats about 250 people.

History
A royal resolution dated 10 January 1633 authorized the construction of the first church in Bjugn. The cruciform church was built in 1637. The old church burned down in a fire in 1952, but the altarpiece, baptismal font, and several other items were saved from the fire. The present church was rebuilt in 1956 on the same location using the same design as the previous church.

Media gallery

See also
List of churches in Nidaros

References

External links

http://kirken.no/bjugn 

Ørland
Churches in Trøndelag
Wooden churches in Norway
Cruciform churches in Norway
20th-century Church of Norway church buildings
Churches completed in 1956
17th-century establishments in Norway